St. Martin's or St. Martins may refer to:

Places
 St. Martins, Missouri, a city in the USA
 St Martin's, Isles of Scilly, an island off the Cornish coast, England
 St Martin's, North Yorkshire, England
 St Martins, Perth and Kinross, Scotland
 St Martin's, Shropshire, a village in England
 St Martin's, Guernsey, a parish in the Channel Islands
 St Martins (ward), a former electoral ward of Trafford, Greater Manchester, from 1973 to 2003
 Saint Martins Parish, New Brunswick, Canada
 St. Martins, New Brunswick, a village therein
 St Martins, New Zealand, a suburb of Christchurch, New Zealand
 St. Martin's Island, a coral reef island of Bangladesh in Bay of Bengal
 Saint Martin's Island a small island at the mouth of Green Bay in Wisconsin
 St. Martin's, Wisconsin, a former hamlet in the Town of Franklin, Milwaukee County, Wisconsin
 Saint Martins, Barbados, a village in Saint Philip Parish

Religion and folklore
 St. Martin's Church (disambiguation), churches dedicated to St Martin
 St. Martin's Day, or Martinmas, falling on November 11
 St. Martin's Land, an enigmatic and likely mythical location associated with the legend of the green children of Woolpit

Education
 St Martin's Catholic Academy, a secondary school in Leicestershire, England
 St Martin's College, an institution of higher education in the United Kingdom
 St. Martin's University, a university in Lacey, Washington
 Central Saint Martins College of Art and Design in London, often referred to as St. Martin's College and formerly Saint Martins School of Art
 St Martin's School (disambiguation)

Sport
 St Martin's GAA (County Kilkenny), a Gaelic Athletic Association club based in the Ballyfoyle/Coon/Muckalee area of County Kilkenny, Ireland
 St. Martin's GAA (Wexford), a Gaelic Athletic Association club located in Piercestown, County Wexford, Ireland

Other uses
 St. Martin's Press, a New York publisher
 St Martin's Theatre, in the West End of London
 St. Martins (SEPTA station), a commuter rail station in Philadelphia, Pennsylvania

See also
 St. Martin (disambiguation)